Åsmund Åmli Band is a Norwegian country/rock band from Valle in Setesdalen, formed in 1996. They have sold more than 20,000 albums worldwide and are one of Norway's most successful country bands.

Members

Current members
Åsmund Åmli – lead vocals, bass
Bjørn Stiauren - drums
Stian Øvland - guitar
Dag Wolf - pedal steel guitar

Former members
Arne Vigeland - pedal steel guitar

Discography

Studio albums

EPs

References 

Norwegian country rock groups
Musical groups established in 1996
1996 establishments in Norway
Musical groups from Agder